Happy Birthday is a 2016 Indian Kannada language romantic action film written, directed and co-produced by Mahesh Sukhadhare. It stars Sachin, making his debut, and Samskruthy Shenoy in the lead roles along with guest appearances by actors Ambareesh and Srinagar Kitty. The music of the film is composed by V. Harikrishna whilst the cinematography is by Suresh Jayakrishna.

Principal photography for the film began in June 2015 by Sai Prasad and the shooting was held around Mandya district.

Cast

 Sachin
 Samskruthy Shenoy as Anjali
 Achyuth Kumar
 Ravi Kale
 Ninasam Ashwath
 Prashanth Siddi
 Rajesh Nataranga
 Aruna Balaraj
 Ashwini
 Sadhu Kokila
 Chikkanna
 Bullet Prakash
 H. G. Dattatreya
 Sanjay
 Harish Jayakrishna
 B Shilpa
 Disha Gowda
 Neethushree
 Ambareesh in a guest appearance
 Srinagar Kitty in a guest appearance

Soundtrack

V. Harikrishna has composed the film's background score and music for its soundtrack. The audio was officially launched by actor Yash. The event was attended by many celebrities from the cinema industry and political parties. It was held on 23 July 2016 at Sir M. Vishweshwaraiah grounds in Mandya.

Reception

Critical response 

Shyam Prasad S of Bangalore Mirror scored the film at 3.5 out of 5 stars and wrote "At least two songs are blockbuster material. Aerial shots stop being impressive after a point due to excessive use of drones. The phrase, Happy Birthday, has a completely different meaning in some parts of rural Karnataka. If you don’t know what it is and are curious, the film may well provide you with more than the entertainment you asked for." Sunayana Suresh of The Times of India scored the film at 3 out of 5 stars and wrote "One of the highlights of the film is the Hogume song, which lingers on even after you've left the cinema hall. This film will work for audience that love their masala fare, replete with action, unpalatable comedy, romance and a fair share of melodrama too."The Hindu wrote "The dialogues are set in the dialect of the region. With a stiff body language, Sachin can barely act or emote. Samskruthi saves the film partially with her performance. Achyuth Kumar and Rajesh Nataranga do what they can within their roles."

References

External links
 
 Facebook page

2016 films
2010s romantic action films
Indian romantic action films
Films scored by V. Harikrishna
2010s Kannada-language films